Coram Boy is a play written by Helen Edmundson with music composed by Adrian Sutton, based on the 2000 children's novel of the same name by Jamila Gavin, an epic adventure that concerns the theme of child cruelty.  The play is called a "play with music", rather than a musical.

Synopsis
The action takes place in the eighteenth century.  
The benevolent Thomas Coram has recently opened a Foundling Hospital in London called the "Coram Hospital for Deserted Children".  Unscrupulous men, known as "Coram men", take advantage of the situation by promising desperate mothers to take their unwanted children to the hospital for a fee.  The story follows a range of characters, focusing on two orphans: Toby, saved from an African slave ship; and Aaron, the deserted son of the heir to an estate, as their lives become closely involved with this true and tragic episode of British social history.

Productions

The show was first staged at the National Theatre in London from November 2005 until February 2006.  It returned to the National Theatre from November 2006 to February 2007.

The play then moved to Broadway at the Imperial Theater, starting previews in April 2007, and officially opening for a month-long run in May 2007.  The show was nominated for six Tony Awards but did not win any.

Melly Still was the director and co-designer (with Ti Green) of both the London and New York productions with Paule Constable designing lighting and Chris Schutt on sound. Still also directed the December 2011 production for Bristol Old Vic at the Colston Hall and the production was designed by Anna Fleischle, with lighting by Bruno Poet, and sound by Schutt. Adrian Sutton composed the music for all four versions.

Coram Boy is frequently produced in Britain by Universities, Drama schools and amateur groups.

First London Cast (2005 - 2006)
Toby - Akiya Henry
Aaron / Alexander Ashbrook (young) - Anna Madeley
Alexander Ashbrook (adult) - Bertie Carvel
Mrs. Lynch - Ruth Gemmell
Molly - Chetna Pandya
Mrs. Hendry - Sharon Maharaj
Otis Gardiner - Paul Ritter
Thomas Ledbury (adult) - Stuart McLoughlin
Thomas Claymore - Adam Shipway
Meshak - Jack Tarlton
Isobel Ashbrook - Kelly Williams
Edward Ashbrook - Katherine Manners
Miss Price - Inika Leigh Wright
Lord Ashbrook - William Scott Massive
George Frideric Handel - Nick Tizzard
Mrs. Milcote - Eve Matheson
Alice Ashbrook - Sophie Bould
Thomas Ledbury (young) - Abby Ford
Lady Ashbrook - Rebecca Johnson
Melissa / Angel - Justine Mitchell

Second London Cast (2006 - 2007)
Toby - Debbie Korley
Aaron / Alexander Ashbrook (young) - Katherine Manners
Alexander Ashbrook (adult) - Bertie Carvel
Mrs. Lynch - Ruth Gemmell
Molly - Deeivya Meir
Mrs. Hendry - Sharon Maharaj
Otis Gardiner - Tim McMullan
Thomas Ledbury (adult) - Stuart McLoughlin
Thomas Claymore - Adam Shipway
Meshak - Al Weaver
Isobel Ashbrook - Kelly Williams
Edward Ashbrook - Hannah Storey
Miss Price - Inika Leigh Wright
Lord Ashbrook - William Scott Massive
George Frideric Handel - Nick Tizzard
Mrs. Milcote - Clare Burt
Alice Ashbrook - Jenni Maitland
Thomas Ledbury (young) - Abby Ford
Lady Ashbrook - Rebecca Johnson
Melissa / Angel - Justine Mitchell

Broadway Cast
Toby - Uzo Aduba
Aaron / Alexander Ashbrook (young) - Xanthe Elbrick
Alexander Ashbrook (adult) - Wayne Wilcox
Mrs. Lynch - Jan Maxwell
Molly - Jolly Abraham
Mrs. Hendry — Jacqueline Antaramian
Otis Gardiner — Bill Camp
Thomas Ledbury (adult) - Dashiell Eaves
Thomas Claymore — Tom Riis Farrell
Meshak — Brad Fleischer
Isobel Ashbrook - Karron Graves
Edward Ashbrook — Laura Heisler
Miss Price — Angela Lin
Lord Ashbrook — David Andrew Macdonald
George Frideric Handel — Quentin Maré
Mrs. Milcote — Kathleen McNenny
Alice Ashbrook - Cristin Milioti
Thomas Ledbury (young) - Charlotte Parry
Lady Ashbrook — Christina Rouner
Melissa / Angel — Ivy Vahanian

Bristol - Colston Hall (Bristol Old Vic 2011)
Otis Gardiner — Tristan Sturrock
Meshak Gardiner — Fionn Gill
Alexander Ashbrook (young) - George Clark
Alexander Ashbrook (adult) - Freddie Hutchins
Melissa / Angel - Emily Head / Mabel Moll
Mrs. Lynch — Lucy Black
Lord Ashbrook - Simon Shepherd
Lady Ashbrook — Saskia Portway
Isobel Ashbrook — Grace Carter / Florence Woolley
Alice Ashbrook — Esther Lawrence / Bethan Barke / Peggy Edwards
Edward Ashbrook — Tobey Barke / Cameron Fraser
Mrs. Hendry/Mrs. Milcote — Catherine Swingler
Thomas Claymore / George Frideric Handel — Joe Hall
Thomas Ledbury (young) - Johannes Moore / Max Macmillan
Dr Smith/Thomas Ledbury — Ed Birch
Aaron — Toby Yapp / Finn Lacey
Toby — Joe Sharpe
Miss Price — Anna Houghton
The production also included a local cast of Coram children and a local ensemble.

Music
In the National Theatre and Broadway versions the music is performed by a 16-member onstage choir and a seven-piece chamber orchestra.  In Bristol the orchestra was expanded to 20 musicians and the choir was joined at the end of act 2 by  a local chorus of 40 performers. The music includes parts or adaptations of Handel's Messiah and Theodora, as well as over an hour of original music consisting of songs, period-style dance, and chamber music, as well as dramatic underscoring.

Awards and nominations
Tony Award nominations (no wins):
Best Featured Actress in a Play
Xanthe Elbrick
Jan Maxwell
Best Direction of a Play
Best Scenic Design of a Play
Best Costume Design of a Play
Best Lighting Design of a Play

2007 Theatre World Award - Xanthe Elbrick (winner)

Drama Desk Award nominations for Outstanding Featured Actress in a Play:
Xanthe Elbrick
Jan Maxwell

Outer Critics Circle Award nominations (no wins):
Outstanding New Broadway Play
Outstanding Director of a Play (Lucille Lortel Award)
Outstanding Set Design (Ti Green & Melly Still)
Outstanding Lighting Design (Paule Constable)
Olivier Award Nominations (no wins) 
Best new play (Helen Edmundson)
Best performance in a supporting role (Paul Ritter)
Best Director (Melly Still)
Best Sound (Christopher Shutt)

References

External links
Coram Boy on Broadway
Internet Broadway Database listing
Playbill May 18, 2007
Curtain Up review of Broadway production
Review of London production, November 2005
Information about the rehearsal process

Helen Edmundson
Broadway plays
Plays set in the 18th century
Foundling Hospital